The 1991 Pittsburgh Pirates season was the 110th in franchise history; the 105th in the National League. This was their 22nd season at Three Rivers Stadium. For the second consecutive season, the Pirates won the National League East Division title with a record of 98–64. The Pirates finished the season with the best record in Major League Baseball. They were defeated four games to three by the Atlanta Braves in the 1991 National League Championship Series. During the season, John Smiley won 20 games – the last to do so for the Pirates in the 20th century.

Offseason
 December 6, 1990: Zane Smith was signed as a free agent by the Pirates.
 February 4, 1991: Mark Huismann was signed as a free agent by the Pirates.
 March 21, 1991: Esteban Loaiza was signed as an amateur free agent by the Pirates.
 March 29, 1991: Steve Carter was traded by the Pirates to the Chicago Cubs for Gary Varsho.

Regular season

Season standings

Game log

|- style="background:#fbb;"
| 1 || April 8 || Expos || 0–7 || Martinez || Drabek || — || 54,274 || 0–1
|- style="background:#cfc;"
| 2 || April 9 || Expos || 4–3 || Kipper || Frey || Landrum || 6,624 || 1–1
|- style="background:#cfc;"
| 3 || April 10 || Expos || 6–3 || Smith || Boyd || Belinda || 7,656 || 2–1
|- style="background:#cfc;"
| 4 || April 12 || @ Cubs || 3–1 || Smiley || Boskie || Palacios || 8,704 || 3–1
|- style="background:#fbb;"
| 5 || April 13 || @ Cubs || 3–7 || Bielecki || Drabek || — || 23,838 || 3–2
|- style="background:#fbb;"
| 6 || April 14 || @ Cubs || 4–6 || Slocumb || Belinda || Smith || 25,994 || 3–3
|- style="background:#fbb;"
| 7 || April 15 || Mets || 3–9 || Cone || Kipper || — || 6,785 || 3–4
|- style="background:#cfc;"
| 8 || April 16 || Mets || 4–2 || Tomlin || Whitehurst || Belinda || 16,963 || 4–4
|- style="background:#cfc;"
| 9 || April 17 || Mets || 4–0 || Smiley || Darling || — || 14,792 || 5–4
|- style="background:#fbb;"
| 10 || April 18 || Cubs || 2–3 || Sutcliffe || Drabek || Assenmacher || 9,148 || 5–5
|- style="background:#cfc;"
| 11 || April 19 || Cubs || 5–4 || Belinda || Smith || — || 13,157 || 6–5
|- style="background:#cfc;"
| 12 || April 20 || Cubs || 9–3 || Smith || Maddux || — || 13,179 || 7–5
|- style="background:#cfc;"
| 13 || April 21 || Cubs || 13–12 (11) || Patterson || Bielecki || — || 10,860 || 8–5
|- style="background:#cfc;"
| 14 || April 23 || @ Expos || 7–3 || Smiley || Sampen || — || 7,770 || 9–5
|- style="background:#cfc;"
| 15 || April 24 || @ Expos || 2–1 || Drabek || Martinez || Landrum || 8,592 || 10–5
|- style="background:#cfc;"
| 16 || April 25 || @ Expos || 8–0 || Palacios || Nabholz || — || 7,868 || 11–5
|- style="background:#fbb;"
| 17 || April 26 || @ Mets || 0–2 || Viola || Smith || Franco || 30,702 || 11–6
|- style="background:#cfc;"
| 18 || April 27 || @ Mets || 10–1 || Tomlin || Cone || — || 32,062 || 12–6
|- style="background:#cfc;"
| 19 || April 28 || @ Mets || 7–3 || Smiley || Darling || — || 34,141 || 13–6
|- style="background:#fbb;"
| 20 || April 30 || @ Reds || 3–4 || Browning || Drabek || Dibble || 20,627 || 13–7
|-

|- style="background:#cfc;"
| 21 || May 1 || @ Reds || 6–4 || Belinda || Myers || Landrum || 25,231 || 14–7
|- style="background:#cfc;"
| 22 || May 3 || Astros || 1–0 || Smith || Harnisch || — || 24,145 || 15–7
|- style="background:#fbb;"
| 23 || May 4 || Astros || 3–8 || Jones || Smiley || Clancy || 19,257 || 15–8
|- style="background:#fbb;"
| 24 || May 5 || Astros || 4–6 || Portugal || Drabek || Schilling || 17,727 || 15–9
|- style="background:#cfc;"
| 25 || May 6 || Reds || 3–1 || Palacios || Rijo || Landrum || 9,518 || 16–9
|- style="background:#cfc;"
| 26 || May 7 || Reds || 7–2 || Tomlin || Hammond || Belinda || 14,258 || 17–9
|- style="background:#cfc;"
| 27 || May 8 || Reds || 7–2 || Smith || Charlton || — || 14,594 || 18–9
|- style="background:#cfc;"
| 28 || May 10 || Braves || 5–2 || Smiley || Smoltz || Belinda || 23,936 || 19–9
|- style="background:#fbb;"
| 29 || May 11 || Braves || 2–3 || Leibrandt || Drabek || Mercker || 33,914 || 19–10
|- style="background:#fbb;"
| 30 || May 12 || Braves || 1–6 || Avery || Palacios || Berenguer || 20,287 || 19–11
|- style="background:#cfc;"
| 31 || May 14 || @ Astros || 6–3 || Smith || Harnisch || — || 7,846 || 20–11
|- style="background:#cfc;"
| 32 || May 15 || @ Astros || 8–7 || Kipper || Schilling || Landrum || 9,577 || 21–11
|- style="background:#cfc;"
| 33 || May 16 || @ Astros || 6–4 || Drabek || Clancy || Belinda || 8,419 || 22–11
|- style="background:#fbb;"
| 34 || May 17 || @ Braves || 3–9 || Avery || Palacios || — || 32,824 || 22–12
|- style="background:#fbb;"
| 35 || May 19 || @ Braves || 1–7 || Glavine || Smith || Berenguer || 27,164 || 22–13
|- style="background:#cfc;"
| 36 || May 21 || Cardinals || 5–3 || Smiley || Moyer || Landrum || 9,226 || 23–13
|- style="background:#fbb;"
| 37 || May 22 || Cardinals || 3–5 || Carpenter || Drabek || Smith || 19,630 || 23–14
|- style="background:#fbb;"
| 38 || May 23 || Cardinals || 2–8 || DeLeon || Tomlin || Terry || 8,557 || 23–15
|- style="background:#cfc;"
| 39 || May 24 || Phillies || 9–1 || Smith || Mulholland || — || 29,770 || 24–15
|- style="background:#cfc;"
| 40 || May 25 || Phillies || 4–2 (11) || Palacios || Boever || — || 24,358 || 25–15
|- style="background:#cfc;"
| 41 || May 26 || Phillies || 5–2 || Smiley || Grimsley || Landrum || 26,117 || 26–15
|- style="background:#cfc;"
| 42 || May 27 || @ Cardinals || 8–0 || Drabek || Tewksbury || — || 40,667 || 27–15
|- style="background:#cfc;"
| 43 || May 28 || @ Cardinals || 9–8 || Belinda || DeLeon || Landrum || 22,766 || 28–15
|- style="background:#cfc;"
| 44 || May 29 || @ Cardinals || 6–0 || Smith || Smith || — || 27,178 || 29–15
|- style="background:#cfc;"
| 45 || May 31 || @ Phillies || 5–1 || Walk || Grimsley || — || 25,652 || 30–15
|-

|- style="background:#cfc;"
| 46 || June 1 || @ Phillies || 5–3 || Smiley || Combs || Landrum || 31,601 || 31–15
|- style="background:#cfc;"
| 47 || June 2 || @ Phillies || 5–3 || Walk || Williams || Patterson || 36,185 || 32–15
|- style="background:#fbb;"
| 48 || June 4 || Giants || 3–5 || Burkett || Smith || Righetti || 19,460 || 32–16
|- style="background:#cfc;"
| 49 || June 5 || Giants || 7–3 || Walk || Downs || — || 15,461 || 33–16
|- style="background:#fbb;"
| 50 || June 6 || Giants || 3–6 || Black || Smiley || Righetti || 23,662 || 33–17
|- style="background:#cfc;"
| 51 || June 7 || Padres || 1–0 || Drabek || Hurst || Landrum || 25,095 || 34–17
|- style="background:#fbb;"
| 52 || June 8 || Padres || 0–11 || Maddux || Tomlin || — || 51,292 || 34–18
|- style="background:#fbb;"
| 53 || June 9 || Padres || 3–5 || Benes || Smith || Lefferts || 33,278 || 34–19
|- style="background:#cfc;"
| 54 || June 10 || Padres || 5–3 || Palacios || Rasmussen || Landrum || 10,512 || 35–19
|- style="background:#cfc;"
| 55 || June 12 || Dodgers || 2–1 || Drabek || Morgan || Landrum || 21,898 || 36–19
|- style="background:#fbb;"
| 56 || June 13 || Dodgers || 2–3 || Gott || Tomlin || Howell || 26,377 || 36–20
|- style="background:#fbb;"
| 57 || June 14 || @ Giants || 2–3 || Oliveras || Smith || Righetti || 17,333 || 36–21
|- style="background:#fbb;"
| 58 || June 15 || @ Giants || 0–4 || Remlinger || Smiley || — || 31,807 || 36–22
|- style="background:#cfc;"
| 59 || June 16 || @ Giants || 4–3 || Walk || Black || Landrum || 27,634 || 37–22
|- style="background:#cfc;"
| 60 || June 17 || @ Padres || 3–2 || Drabek || Hurst || Palacios || 15,951 || 38–22
|- style="background:#cfc;"
| 61 || June 18 || @ Padres || 3–1 || Landrum || Lefferts || — || 14,697 || 39–22
|- style="background:#fbb;"
| 62 || June 19 || @ Padres || 5–6 || Andersen || Heaton || — || 27,272 || 39–23
|- style="background:#fbb;"
| 63 || June 20 || @ Dodgers || 2–3 || Gross || Smiley || — || 50,060 || 39–24
|- style="background:#cfc;"
| 64 || June 21 || @ Dodgers || 5–1 || Walk || Ojeda || Kipper || 44,085 || 40–24
|- style="background:#fbb;"
| 65 || June 22 || @ Dodgers || 1–4 || Morgan || Drabek || — || 42,891 || 40–25
|- style="background:#fbb;"
| 66 || June 23 || @ Dodgers || 0–2 || Belcher || Smith || Crews || 46,354 || 40–26
|- style="background:#fbb;"
| 67 || June 25 || Cubs || 1–5 || Lancaster || Smiley || — || 31,115 || 40–27
|- style="background:#cfc;"
| 68 || June 26 || Cubs || 7–6 || Walk || Maddux || Landrum || 41,389 || 41–27
|- style="background:#cfc;"
| 69 || June 27 || Cubs || 4–3 || Palacios || Assenmacher || — || 30,960 || 42–27
|- style="background:#cfc;"
| 70 || June 28 || @ Expos || 6–1 || Smith || Haney || — || 14,501 || 43–27
|- style="background:#cfc;"
| 71 || June 29 || @ Expos || 2–1 || Heaton || Ruskin || Landrum || 16,961 || 44–27
|- style="background:#cfc;"
| 72 || June 30 || @ Expos || 2–1 || Smiley || Martinez || Belinda || 22,920 || 45–27
|-

|- style="background:#fbb;"
| 73 || July 1 || @ Cubs || 5–6 (13) || Scanlan || Belinda || — || 32,633 || 45–28
|- style="background:#cfc;"
| 74 || July 2 || @ Cubs || 13–4 || Drabek || Boskie || — || 34,332 || 46–28
|- style="background:#cfc;"
| 75 || July 3 || @ Cubs || 11–7 || Smith || Lancaster || — || 33,432 || 47–28
|- style="background:#fbb;"
| 76 || July 4 || @ Cubs || 8–9 (11) || McElroy || Landrum || — || 31,098 || 47–29
|- style="background:#fbb;"
| 77 || July 5 || Expos || 3–4 || Martinez || Smiley || — || 37,807 || 47–30
|- style="background:#fbb;"
| 78 || July 6 || Expos || 1–2 || Gardner || Walk || Burke || 34,182 || 47–31
|- style="background:#cfc;"
| 79 || July 7 || Expos || 6–1 || Drabek || Boyd || Belinda || 41,995 || 48–31
|- style="background:#cfc;"
| 80 || July 11 || @ Reds || 10–6 || Palacios || Myers || — || 35,159 || 49–31
|- style="background:#cfc;"
| 81 || July 12 || @ Reds || 7–2 || Drabek || Armstrong || — || 42,181 || 50–31
|- style="background:#cfc;"
| 82 || July 13 || @ Reds || 5–2 || Smiley || Browning || Kipper || 48,857 || 51–31
|- style="background:#cfc;"
| 83 || July 14 || @ Reds || 10–6 || Walk || Gross || Patterson || 42,573 || 52–31
|- style="background:#cfc;"
| 84 || July 15 || Astros || 8–0 || Tomlin || Jones || — || 21,642 || 53–31
|- style="background:#cfc;"
| 85 || July 16 || Astros || 6–4 || Smith || Kile || Belinda || 18,028 || 54–31
|- style="background:#fbb;"
| 86 || July 17 || Astros || 2–10 || Jones || Drabek || Osuna || 38,736 || 54–32
|- style="background:#cfc;"
| 87 || July 19 || Reds || 7–2 || Smiley || Browning || — || 38,318 || 55–32
|- style="background:#fbb;"
| 88 || July 20 || Reds || 2–3 || Gross || Walk || Power || 34,805 || 55–33
|- style="background:#cfc;"
| 89 || July 21 || Reds || 6–0 || Tomlin || Hammond || — || 34,717 || 56–33
|- style="background:#fbb;"
| 90 || July 22 || Braves || 3–7 || Smoltz || Smith || — || 20,549 || 56–34
|- style="background:#cfc;"
| 91 || July 23 || Braves || 12–3 || Drabek || Leibrandt || — || 21,664 || 57–34
|- style="background:#cfc;"
| 92 || July 24 || Braves || 7–4 || Smiley || Glavine || Belinda || 26,508 || 58–34
|- style="background:#cfc;"
| 93 || July 26 || @ Astros || 8–1 || Heaton || Kile || — || 26,185 || 59–34
|- style="background:#cfc;"
| 94 || July 27 || @ Astros || 11–5 || Tomlin || Jones || — || 24,447 || 60–34
|- style="background:#fbb;"
| 95 || July 28 || @ Astros || 7–9 || Bowen || Smith || Clancy || 20,754 || 60–35
|- style="background:#fbb;"
| 96 || July 29 || @ Braves || 5–7 || Glavine || Drabek || Freeman || 0 || 60–36
|- style="background:#fbb;"
| 97 || July 29 || @ Braves || 3–5 || Mahler || Smiley || Mercker || 32,292 || 60–37
|- style="background:#fbb;"
| 98 || July 30 || @ Braves || 3–10 || Parrett || Landrum || Mercker || 27,099 || 60–38
|- style="background:#fbb;"
| 99 || July 31 || @ Braves || 6–8 || Smoltz || Palacios || Stanton || 23,955 || 60–39
|-

|- style="background:#fbb;"
| 100 || August 1 || @ Cardinals || 3–6 || Olivares || Tomlin || Smith || 28,276 || 60–40
|- style="background:#fbb;"
| 101 || August 2 || @ Cardinals || 3–4 || McClure || Belinda || — || 36,228 || 60–41
|- style="background:#fbb;"
| 102 || August 3 || @ Cardinals || 5–6 (10) || Smith || Patterson || — || 40,627 || 60–42
|- style="background:#cfc;"
| 103 || August 4 || @ Cardinals || 2–1 || Smiley || Hill || — || 34,243 || 61–42
|- style="background:#cfc;"
| 104 || August 6 || @ Mets || 3–1 || Tomlin || Fernandez || — || 38,658 || 62–42
|- style="background:#fbb;"
| 105 || August 7 || @ Mets || 1–7 || Gooden || Smith || — || 41,542 || 62–43
|- style="background:#fbb;"
| 106 || August 8 || @ Mets || 3–4 || Viola || Drabek || Franco || 41,672 || 62–44
|- style="background:#fbb;"
| 107 || August 9 || Cardinals || 1–5 || Smith || Smiley || — || 38,136 || 62–45
|- style="background:#cfc;"
| 108 || August 10 || Cardinals || 11–5 || Heaton || Hill || — || 49,939 || 63–45
|- style="background:#cfc;"
| 109 || August 11 || Cardinals || 6–4 || Mason || Tewksbury || Landrum || 31,814 || 64–45
|- style="background:#cfc;"
| 110 || August 12 || Cardinals || 4–3 (11) || Patterson || Smith || — || 26,328 || 65–45
|- style="background:#cfc;"
| 111 || August 13 || Phillies || 4–3 || Drabek || Cox || Belinda || 22,584 || 66–45
|- style="background:#cfc;"
| 112 || August 14 || Phillies || 5–3 || Smiley || Greene || Belinda || 42,501 || 67–45
|- style="background:#fbb;"
| 113 || August 15 || Phillies || 4–6 || de Jesus || Heaton || Williams || 28,193 || 67–46
|- style="background:#cfc;"
| 114 || August 16 || Mets || 8–2 || Tomlin || Fernandez || — || 39,275 || 68–46
|- style="background:#cfc;"
| 115 || August 17 || Mets || 4–1 || Smith || Gooden || Belinda || 44,707 || 69–46
|- style="background:#cfc;"
| 116 || August 18 || Mets || 9–2 || Drabek || Viola || — || 36,014 || 70–46
|- style="background:#fbb;"
| 117 || August 20 || @ Phillies || 5–6 || Searcy || Belinda || — || 23,336 || 70–47
|- style="background:#fbb;"
| 118 || August 21 || @ Phillies || 5–6 || Williams || Kipper || — || 35,591 || 70–48
|- style="background:#fbb;"
| 119 || August 22 || @ Phillies || 3–4 (11) || Williams || Landrum || — || 41,544 || 70–49
|- style="background:#cfc;"
| 120 || August 23 || Giants || 8–0 || Drabek || Burkett || — || 32,419 || 71–49
|- style="background:#fbb;"
| 121 || August 24 || Giants || 1–5 || Wilson || Heaton || — || 33,035 || 71–50
|- style="background:#cfc;"
| 122 || August 25 || Giants || 8–3 || Smiley || Oliveras || Belinda || 30,453 || 72–50
|- style="background:#fbb;"
| 123 || August 26 || Padres || 5–7 (10) || Lefferts || Landrum || — || 27,396 || 72–51
|- style="background:#cfc;"
| 124 || August 27 || Padres || 5–2 || Smith || Bones || Mason || 19,227 || 73–51
|- style="background:#cfc;"
| 125 || August 28 || @ Dodgers || 6–4 || Rodriguez || McDowell || Belinda || 39,040 || 74–51
|- style="background:#cfc;"
| 126 || August 29 || @ Dodgers || 4–1 || Mason || Morgan || Landrum || 46,414 || 75–51
|- style="background:#cfc;"
| 127 || August 30 || @ Padres || 4–1 || Smiley || Rasmussen || Rodriguez || 21,726 || 76–51
|- style="background:#cfc;"
| 128 || August 31 || @ Padres || 3–2 (12) || Landrum || Melendez || Kipper || 16,170 || 77–51
|-

|- style="background:#fbb;"
| 129 || September 1 || @ Padres || 4–7 || Bones || Smith || Maddux || 13,099 || 77–52
|- style="background:#cfc;"
| 130 || September 2 || @ Giants || 9–8 || Belinda || Righetti || Rodriguez || 16,971 || 78–52
|- style="background:#cfc;"
| 131 || September 3 || @ Giants || 5–3 (10) || Patterson || Oliveras || — || 9,544 || 79–52
|- style="background:#cfc;"
| 132 || September 4 || @ Giants || 8–3 || Smiley || Black || Mason || 8,690 || 80–52
|- style="background:#fbb;"
| 133 || September 6 || Dodgers || 3–4 || McDowell || Belinda || — || 0 || 80–53
|- style="background:#cfc;"
| 134 || September 6 || Dodgers || 3–1 || Smith || Gross || — || 46,993 || 81–53
|- style="background:#fbb;"
| 135 || September 7 || Dodgers || 1–5 || Ojeda || Drabek || Gott || 37,416 || 81–54
|- style="background:#fbb;"
| 136 || September 8 || Dodgers || 1–5 || Morgan || Patterson || — || 31,563 || 81–55
|- style="background:#cfc;"
| 137 || September 9 || @ Cubs || 12–10 || Belinda || Smith || Rodriguez || 18,775 || 82–55
|- style="background:#fbb;"
| 138 || September 10 || @ Cubs || 2–6 || Sutcliffe || Tomlin || Scanlan || 29,299 || 82–56
|- style="background:#cfc;"
| 139 || September 11 || @ Cardinals || 3–1 || Smith || Tewksbury || — || 20,457 || 83–56
|- style="background:#fbb;"
| 140 || September 12 || @ Cardinals || 0–1 || Hill || Drabek || Smith || 21,412 || 83–57
|- style="background:#cfc;"
| 141 || September 13 || @ Phillies || 8–6 || Belinda || Williams || Rodriguez || 29,107 || 84–57
|- style="background:#cfc;"
| 142 || September 14 || @ Phillies || 5–3 || Smiley || Ashby || Palacios || 27,412 || 85–57
|- style="background:#fbb;"
| 143 || September 15 || @ Phillies || 3–8 || Greene || Tomlin || Williams || 35,560 || 85–58
|- style="background:#cfc;"
| 144 || September 16 || Cubs || 5–4 || Smith || Castillo || Mason || 16,149 || 86–58
|- style="background:#cfc;"
| 145 || September 17 || Cubs || 9–2 || Drabek || Bielecki || — || 18,152 || 87–58
|- style="background:#cfc;"
| 146 || September 18 || Cardinals || 6–5 || Mason || Fraser || — || 30,123 || 88–58
|- style="background:#cfc;"
| 147 || September 19 || Cardinals || 5–1 || Belinda || Olivares || — || 22,904 || 89–58
|- style="background:#fbb;"
| 148 || September 20 || Phillies || 3–8 || Greene || Tomlin || — || 22,691 || 89–59
|- style="background:#cfc;"
| 149 || September 21 || Phillies || 7–0 || Smith || de Jesus || — || 27,162 || 90–59
|- style="background:#cfc;"
| 150 || September 22 || Phillies || 2–1 || Drabek || Brantley || — || 33,662 || 91–59
|- style="background:#cfc;"
| 151 || September 24 || @ Mets || 10–8 || Patterson || Innis || Rodriguez || 12,336 || 92–59
|- style="background:#cfc;"
| 152 || September 26 || @ Mets || 4–3 (15) || Landrum || Whitehurst || — || 0 || 93–59
|- style="background:#fbb;"
| 153 || September 26 || @ Mets || 1–2 || Burke || Mason || Franco || 14,451 || 93–60
|- style="background:#fbb;"
| 154 || September 27 || Expos || 8–12 || Ruskin || Rodriguez || — || 8,201 || 93–61
|- style="background:#fbb;"
| 155 || September 28 || Expos || 2–3 || Nabholz || Drabek || Rojas || 17,122 || 93–62
|- style="background:#cfc;"
| 156 || September 29 || Expos || 6–3 || Walk || Sampen || Kipper || 14,798 || 94–62
|- style="background:#cfc;"
| 157 || September 30 || Mets || 6–5 || Landrum || Simons || Rodriguez || 16,170 || 95–62
|-

|- style="background:#cfc;"
| 158 || October 1 || Mets || 2–1 || Smiley || Cone || Belinda || 14,697 || 96–62
|- style="background:#fbb;"
| 159 || October 2 || Mets || 6–9 (11) || Franco || Patterson || — || 13,328 || 96–63
|- style="background:#fbb;"
| 160 || October 4 || Expos || 1–3 || Jones || Mason || Rojas || 14,227 || 96–64
|- style="background:#cfc;"
| 161 || October 5 || Expos || 4–3 || Walk || Fassero || Belinda || 14,038 || 97–64
|- style="background:#cfc;"
| 162 || October 6 || Expos || 7–0 || Smiley || Barnes || — || 23,429 || 98–64
|-

|-
| Legend:       = Win       = LossBold = Pirates team member

Record vs. opponents

Detailed records

Roster

Opening Day lineup

Awards and honors

1991 Major League Baseball All-Star Game
Bobby Bonilla, DH, starter
John Smiley, P, reserve

Player stats
Batting
Note: G = Games played; AB = At bats; H = Hits; Avg. = Batting average; HR = Home runs; RBI = Runs batted in

Pitching
Note: G = Games pitched; IP = Innings pitched; W = Wins; L = Losses; ERA = Earned run average; SO = Strikeouts

National League Championship Series

Game 1
October 9: Three Rivers Stadium in Pittsburgh, Pennsylvania

Game 2
October 10: Three Rivers Stadium in Pittsburgh, Pennsylvania

Game 3
October 12: Atlanta–Fulton County Stadium in Atlanta

Game 4
October 13: Atlanta–Fulton County Stadium in Atlanta

Game 5
October 14: Atlanta–Fulton County Stadium in Atlanta

Game 6
October 16: Three Rivers Stadium in Pittsburgh, Pennsylvania

Game 7
October 17: Three Rivers Stadium in Pittsburgh, Pennsylvania

Transactions
 May 16, 1991: Mike York was traded by the Pirates to the Cleveland Indians for Mitch Webster.
 June 11, 1991: Mark Huismann was released by the Pirates.

Farm system

References

 1991 Pittsburgh Pirates team at Baseball-Reference
 1991 Pittsburgh Pirates team page at baseball-almanac.com

Pittsburgh Pirates seasons
Pittsburgh Pirates Season, 1991
Pittsburgh Pirates Season, 1991
National League East champion seasons
Pittsburgh Pirates